The Constitution of the German Reich, usually known as the Weimar Constitution (Weimarer Verfassung), was the constitution that governed Germany during the Weimar Republic era (1919–1933). The constitution declared Germany to be a democratic parliamentary republic with a legislature elected under proportional representation. Universal suffrage was established, with a minimum voting age of 20. The constitution technically remained in effect throughout the Nazi era from 1933 to 1945, though practically it had been repealed by the Enabling Act of 1933 and thus its various provisions and protections went unenforced for the duration of Nazi rule.

The constitution's title was the same as the Constitution of the German Empire that preceded it. The German state's official name was Deutsches Reich until the adoption of the 1949 Basic Law.

Origin 
Following the end of World War I, a German National Assembly gathered in the town of Weimar, in the state of Thuringia, after the 19 January 1919 Federal elections, in order to write a constitution for the Reich. The nation was to be a democratic federal republic, governed by a president and parliament.

The constitution was drafted by the lawyer and liberal politician Hugo Preuss, who was then state secretary in the Ministry of the Interior, and later became Minister of the Interior. Preuss criticised the Triple Entente's decision to prohibit the incorporation of Republic of German-Austria into the German Republic after the dissolution of Austria-Hungary and said it was a contradiction of the Wilsonian principle of self-determination of peoples.

Disagreements arose between the delegates over issues such as the national flag, religious education for youth and the rights of the states (Länder) that made up the Reich. The disagreements were resolved by August 1919, but 65 delegates abstained from voting to adopt the Weimar Constitution.

The first President, Friedrich Ebert, signed the new German constitution into law on 11 August 1919. The constitution is named after Weimar although it was signed into law by Friedrich Ebert in Schwarzburg because Ebert was on holiday in Schwarzburg while the parliament working out the constitution was gathered in Weimar.

Federal elections were held in Germany on 6 June 1920 in line with the Weimar Constitution.

Gerhard Anschütz (1867–1948), a noted German teacher of constitutional law, was a prominent commentator of the Weimar Constitution.

Provisions and organization 

The Weimar Constitution was divided into two main parts (Hauptteile). The two parts were divided into seven and five sections, respectively.  In all, there were over 180 articles in the Constitution.

Some of the more noteworthy provisions are described below, including those provisions which proved significant in the demise of the Weimar Republic and the rise of Nazi Germany.

The preamble to the Constitution reads:

Das Deutsche Volk einig in seinen Stämmen und von dem Willen beseelt, sein Reich in Freiheit und Gerechtigkeit zu erneuen und zu festigen, dem inneren und dem äußeren Frieden zu dienen und den gesellschaftlichen Fortschritt zu fördern, hat sich diese Verfassung gegeben.

In English, this can be translated as:

The German people, united in its tribes and inspired with the will to renew and strengthen its realm (Reich) in liberty and justice, to serve internal and external peace, and to promote social progress, has adopted this Constitution.

Main Part I: Composition of the Reich and its Responsibility 
The first part (Erster Hauptteil) of the Constitution specified the organization of the various components of the Reich government.

Section 1: The Reich and its States 
Section 1 consisted of Articles 1 to 19 and established the German Reich as a republic whose power derived from the people. ("The power of the state emanates from the people.") The Reich was defined as the region encompassed by the German states (Länder), and other regions could join the Reich based on popular self-determination and Reich legislation.

Section 1 also established that generally recognized principles of international law were binding on Germany and gave the Reich government  exclusive jurisdiction of:
 foreign relations, colonial affairs, citizenship
 freedom of movement
 immigration, emigration, and extradition.
 defense
 customs and trade
 currency and coinage
 postal, telegraph, and telephone service

With the exceptions of the subjects for which the Reich government had exclusive jurisdiction, the states could govern their respective territories as they saw fit.  However, Reich law superseded or nullified state law in the event of a conflict. Adjudication of conflicts between a state and the Reich government was in the jurisdiction of the Supreme Court.

State authorities were required to enforce Reich law and must have a constitution on free state principles. Each state parliament (Landtag) was to be elected by an equal and secret ballot according to representative election. Each state government could serve only so long as it had the confidence of the respective state parliament.

Section 2: The Reichstag and the Reich Government 
Articles 20 to 40 described the national parliament, the Reichstag, which was seated in the capital, Berlin.  The Reichstag was composed of representatives elected by the German people by an equal and secret ballot open to all Germans aged 20 or older.  Proportional representation principles governed Reichstag elections.

Members of the Reichstag represented the entire nation and were bound only to their own conscience.  Members served for four years. The Reichstag could be dissolved by the Reich president and new elections held not more than 60 days after the date of dissolution.

Members of the Reichstag and of each state parliament (Landtag) were immune from arrest or investigation of a criminal offense except with the approval of the legislative body to which the person  belonged. The same approval was required for any other restriction on personal freedom which might harm the member's ability to fulfil his duties. (Article 37)

The President served a term of seven years and could be re-elected once. He could be removed from office by plebiscite upon the vote of two-thirds of the Reichstag. Rejection of the measure by the voters would act as a re-election of the president and causes the Reichstag to be dissolved.  If a state failed to fulfil its obligations under the constitution or Reich law, the president could use armed force to compel the state to do so.  Furthermore, Article 48 gave the President the power to take measures – including the use of armed force and/or the suspension of civil rights – to restore law and order in the event of a serious threat to public safety or Reich security.  The president was required to inform the Reichstag of these measures and the Reichstag could nullify such a presidential decree. (Adolf Hitler later used this Article to legally sweep away the civil liberties granted in the constitution and facilitate the establishment of a dictatorship.)

The Reich chancellor determined the political guidelines of his government and was responsible to the Reichstag. The chancellor and ministers were compelled to resign in the event the Reichstag passed a vote of no confidence. The Reich government (cabinet) formulated decisions by majority vote; in the case of a tie, the Reich president's vote was decisive. The Reichstag could accuse the Reich president, chancellor, or any minister of willful violation of the Constitution or Reich law, said case to be tried in the Supreme Court.

Section 3: The President of the Reich and the National Ministry 
Articles 41 to 59 describe the duties of the President, including criteria for the office. Furthermore, they also further explain his relationship to the National Ministry and its relation to the Chancellor.

Section 4: The Reichsrat 

Section 4 consisted of Articles 60 to 67 and established the Reichsrat (State Council). The Reichsrat was the means by which the states could participate in the making of legislation at the national level. Members of the Reichsrat were members or representatives of the state parliaments, and were bound by the instructions of their respective state governments. Government ministers were required to inform the Reichsrat of proposed legislation or administrative regulations to permit the Reichsrat to voice objections.

Section 5: Reich legislation 
Articles 68 to 77 specified how legislation is to be passed into law. Laws could be proposed by a member of the Reichstag or by the Reich government and were passed on the majority vote of the Reichstag. Proposed legislation had to be presented to the Reichsrat, and the latter body's objections were required to be presented to the Reichstag.

The Reich president had the power to decree that a proposed law be presented to the voters as a plebiscite before taking effect.

The Reichsrat was entitled to object to laws passed by the Reichstag. If this objection could not be resolved, the Reich president at his discretion could call for a plebiscite or let the proposed law die. If the Reichstag voted to overrule the Reichsrat's objection by a two-thirds majority, the Reich president was obligated to either proclaim the law into force or to call for a plebiscite.

Constitutional amendments were proposed as ordinary legislation, but for such an amendment to take effect, it was required that two-thirds or more of the Reichstag members be present, and that at least two-thirds of the members present voted in favor of the legislation.

The Reich government had the authority to establish administrative regulations unless Reich law specified otherwise.

Section 6: Reich administration 

Articles 78 to 101 described the methods by which the Reich government administered the constitution and laws, particularly in the areas where the Reich government had exclusive jurisdiction – foreign relations, colonial affairs, defence, taxation and customs, merchant shipping and waterways, railroads, and so forth.

Section 7: Justice 
Articles 102 to 108 established the justice system of the Weimar Republic. The principal provision established judicial independence – judges were subject only to the law.

This section established a Supreme Court and also established administrative courts to adjudicate disputes between citizens and administrative offices of the state.

Main Part II: Basic rights and obligations of Germans 
The second part (Zweiter Hauptteil) of the Weimar Constitution laid out the basic rights (Grundrechte) and basic obligations (Grundpflichten) of Germans.

The constitution guaranteed individual rights such as the freedom of speech and assembly to each citizen. These were based on the provisions of the earlier constitution of 1848.

Section 1: The Individual 
Articles 109 to 118 set forth individual rights of Germans, the principal tenet being that every German was equal before the law. Men and women had "in principle" the same civil rights and duties, which meant that the family law rules of the Civil Code from 1896 remained unaffected. Privileges based on birth or social status were abolished. Official recognition of the titles of nobility ceased, except as a part of a person's name, and further creation of noble titles was discontinued.

A citizen of any of the German states was likewise a citizen of the Reich.  Germans had the right of mobility and residence, and the right to acquire property and pursue a trade. They had the right to immigrate or emigrate, and the right to Reich protection against foreign authorities.

The "national identity" of foreign language communities in Germany was protected, including the right to use their native language in education, administration, and the judicial system.

Other specific articles stated that:

 The rights of the individual are inviolable. Individual liberties may be limited or deprived only on the basis of law.  Persons have the right to be notified within a day of their arrest or detention as to the authority and reasons for their detention and be given the opportunity to object. This is equivalent to the principle of habeas corpus in the common law of England and elsewhere. (Article 114)
 A German's home is an asylum and is inviolable. (Article 115)
 Privacy of correspondence, of mail, telegraph, and telephone are inviolable. (Article 117)
 Germans are entitled to free expression of opinion in word, writing, print, image, etc. This right cannot be obstructed by job contract, nor can exercise of this right create a disadvantage. Censorship is prohibited. (Article 118)

Section 2: Community Life 

Articles 119 to 134 guided Germans' interaction with the community and established, among other things, that:

 Germans had the right to assemble peacefully and unarmed without prior permission. (Article 123)
 Germans were entitled to form clubs or societies, which were permitted to acquire legal status. This status could not be denied because of the organization's political, socio-political or religious goals. (Article 124)
 Free and secret elections were guaranteed. (Article 125)
 All citizens were eligible for public office, without discrimination, based on their abilities. Gender discrimination toward female civil servants was abolished (Article 128). This allowed the first women, like Anita Augspurg, to practice law.
 Civil servants served the whole nation, not a specific party.  They enjoyed freedom of political opinion. (Article 130)
 Citizens could be required to provide services to the state and community, including compulsory military service under regulations set by Reich law.

Section 3: Religion and Religious Communities 
The religious rights of Germans were enumerated in Articles 135 to 141. Residents of the Reich were granted freedom of belief and conscience. Free practice of religion was guaranteed by the constitution and protected by the state, and no state church was established.

Furthermore, the exercise of civil and civic rights and admission to state office were independent of one's religious beliefs. Public declaration of religious beliefs were not required, and no one was forced to join in a religious act or swear a religious oath.

Five articles from this section of the Constitution (Nos. 136–139 and 141) were explicitly incorporated into the Basic Law of the Federal Republic of Germany (passed in 1949), and so remain Constitutional Law in Germany today.

Section 4: Education and School 
Articles 142 to 150 guided the operation of educational institutions within the Reich. Public education was provided by state institutions and regulated by the government, with cooperation between the Reich, the state, and the local community. Primary school was compulsory, with advanced schooling available to age 18 free of charge.

The constitution also provided for private schooling, which was likewise regulated by the government.
In private schools operated by religious communities, religious instruction could be taught in accordance with the religious community's principles.

Section 5: The Economy 
Constitutional provisions about economic affairs were given in Articles 151 to 165. One of the fundamental principles was that economic life should conform to the principles of justice, with the goal of achieving a dignified life for all and securing the economic freedom of the individual.
The right to property was guaranteed by Article 153. Expropriation of property could be made only on the basis of law and for the public welfare, with appropriate compensation.

The Reich protected labor, intellectual creation, and the rights of authors, inventors, and artists. The right to form unions and to improve working conditions was guaranteed to every individual and to all occupations, and protection of the self-employed was established.
Workers and employees were given the right to participate, on an equal footing with employers, in the regulation of wages and working conditions as well as in economic development.

Transition and Final Clauses 
The final 16 articles (Articles 166 to 181) of the Weimar Constitution provided for the orderly transition to the new constitution, and stipulated in some cases when the various provisions of the new constitution take effect. In cases where legislation had yet to be passed (such as the laws governing the new Supreme Court), these articles stipulated how the constitutional authority would be exercised in the interim by existing institutions. This section also stipulated that new bodies established by the constitution took the place of obsolete bodies (such as the National Assembly) where those bodies were referred to by name in old laws or decrees.

It was mandated that public servants and members of the armed forces were to take an oath on this constitution.

The previous constitution, dated 15 April 1871, was suspended but other Reich laws and decrees that did not contradict the new constitution remained in force. Other official decrees based on hitherto-valid law remained valid until superseded by law or by decree.

The National Assembly was regarded as the Reichstag until the first Reichstag was elected and convened, and the Reich president elected by the National Assembly was to serve until 30 June 1925.

Weaknesses 

In his book The Rise and Fall of the Third Reich, historian William L. Shirer described the Weimar Constitution as "on paper, the most liberal and democratic document of its kind the twentieth century had ever seen ... full of ingenious and admirable devices which seemed to guarantee the working of an almost flawless democracy." Yet, the Weimar Constitution had serious problems.

The allocation of presidential powers was deeply problematic. The Weimar Constitution allowed the president to dismiss the chancellor, even if the chancellor retained the confidence of the Reichstag. Similarly, the president could appoint a chancellor who did not have the support of the Reichstag. Further, the government structure was a mix of presidential and parliamentary systems, with the president acting as a "replacement Kaiser" and assuming some of the powers the monarch would have wielded.  Article 48, the so-called Notverordnung (emergency decree) provision, gave the president broad powers to suspend civil liberties with an insufficient system of checks and balances. This presented an opportunity that Adolf Hitler was quick to seize once he became chancellor (see Reichstag fire). Also the President was allowed to depose local governments, which has been used four times, only targeting left wing ministers (see Reichsexekution).

The use of a proportional electoral system without thresholds to win representation has also been cited. This system, intended to avoid the wasting of votes, allowed the rise of a multitude of splinter parties, many of which represented the extreme ends of the political spectrum, which in turn made it difficult for any party to establish and maintain a workable parliamentary majority. This factionalism was one contributing factor in the frequent changes in government. Shirer cites the presence of some 28 political parties in the 1930 national elections; Otto Friedrich cites 40 different groups in the Reichstag in 1933. There was no threshold to win representation in the Reichstag, and hence no safeguard against a quick rise of an extremist party. It was possible to win a seat in the chamber with as little as 0.4 percent of the vote. In the 1924 elections, for instance, the Bavarian Peasants' League got just 0.7% of the vote—but this was enough for three seats in the Reichstag. However, the rise of the Nazis (NSDAP) to form the largest party during the 1932 elections, can only be attributed to the sentiment of electors in Weimar Germany. Critics of electoral thresholds dispute the argument that the Nazis' token presence in the Reichstags of the 1920s significantly aided their rise to power and that the existence of thresholds in the Weimar constitution would not in fact have hindered Hitler's ambitions—indeed, once the Nazis had passed the thresholds, their existence would have actually aided the Nazis by allowing them to marginalize smaller parties even more quickly.

Even without these real and/or perceived problems, the Weimar Constitution was established and in force under disadvantageous social, political, and economic conditions. In his book The Coming of the Third Reich, historian Richard J. Evans argues that "all in all, Weimar's constitution was no worse than the constitutions of most other countries in the 1920s, and a good deal more democratic than many. Its more problematical provisions might not have mattered so much had the circumstances been different. But the fatal lack of legitimacy from which the Republic suffered magnified the constitution's faults many times over."

Hitler's subversion of the Weimar Constitution 
Less than a month after Adolf Hitler’s appointment as chancellor in 1933, the Reichstag Fire Decree invoked Article 48 of the Weimar Constitution, suspending several constitutional protections on civil rights.  The articles affected were 114 (habeas corpus), 115 (inviolability of residence), 117 (correspondence privacy), 118 (freedom of expression/censorship), 123 (assembly), 124 (associations), and 153 (expropriation).

The subsequent Enabling Act, passed by the Reichstag on 23 March 1933, stated that, in addition to the traditional method of the Reichstag passing legislation, the Reich government could also pass legislation. It further stated that the powers of the Reichstag, Reichsrat and Reich President were not affected. The normal legislative procedures outlined in Articles 68 to 77 of the constitution did not apply to legislation promulgated by the Reich government.

The Enabling Act was effectively a constitutional amendment because of the foregoing alterations to the normal legislative process. The act met the constitutional requirements (two-thirds of the Reichstag's members were present, and two-thirds of the members present voted in favor of the measure).  The Act did not explicitly amend the Weimar Constitution, but there was explicit mention to the fact that the procedure sufficient for constitutional reform was followed.  The constitution of 1919 was never formally repealed, but the Enabling Act meant that all its other provisions were a dead letter.

Two of the penultimate acts Hitler took to consolidate his power in 1934 actually violated the Enabling Act. Article 2 of the act stated that

Laws enacted by the government of the Reich may deviate from the constitution as long as they do not affect the institutions of the Reichstag and the Reichsrat. The rights of the President remain undisturbed.

On 14 February 1934, the "Law on the Abolition of the Reichsrat" eliminated the Reichsrat completely, despite the explicit protection of its existence. Then, when Hindenburg died on 2 August, Hitler appropriated the president's powers for himself in accordance with a law passed the previous day. However, due to a constitutional amendment made in December 1932, the acting president, pending new elections, should have been Erwin Bumke, the president of the Reichsgericht (Imperial Court of Justice), not the chancellor. Nonetheless, the Enabling Act did not specify any recourse that could be taken if the chancellor violated Article 2, and no legal challenge was ever mounted.

Legacy 
After the passage of the Enabling Act, the constitution was largely forgotten. Nonetheless, Hitler used it to give his dictatorship the appearance of legality. Three Reichstag elections were held during his rule. However, voters were presented with a single list of Nazis and "guest candidates". Secret voting technically remained possible, but the Nazis made use of aggressive extralegal measures at the polling stations to intimidate the electors from attempting to vote in secret. Thousands of his decrees were based explicitly on the Reichstag Fire Decree, and hence on Article 48.

In Hitler's 1945 political testament (written shortly before his suicide), he appointed Admiral Karl Dönitz to succeed him.  However, he named Dönitz as President, not Führer, thereby re-establishing a constitutional office which had lain dormant since Hindenburg's death ten years earlier. On 30 April 1945, Dönitz formed what became known as the Flensburg government, which controlled only a tiny area of Germany near the Danish border, including the town of Flensburg. It was dissolved by the Allies on 23 May. On 5 June, the Allied Berlin Declaration abolished all the institutions of German civil government, and this established that the constitution no longer held any legal force.

The 1949 Constitution of the German Democratic Republic (otherwise known as East Germany) contained many passages that were directly copied from the 1919 constitution. It was intended to be the constitution of a united Germany, and was thus a compromise between liberal-democratic and Marxist–Leninist ideologies. It was replaced by a new, explicitly Communist constitution in 1968, which remained in force until the reunification of Germany in 1990.

The Basic Law for the Federal Republic of Germany, enacted in 1949, said "provisions of Articles 136, 137, 138, 139 and 141 of the German Constitution of 11 August 1919 shall be an integral part of this Basic Law". These articles of the Weimar constitution (which dealt with the state's relationship to the different Christian denominations) remain part of the German Basic Law.

In the judicial system based on the Basic Law, the Weimar constitution initially retained the force of law (with the exception of the Church articles on a non-constitutional level), where the Basic Law contained nothing to the contrary. These norms were, however, largely redundant or dealing with matters reserved to the Länder, and as such officially set out of force within two decades; aside from the Church articles, the rule that titles of nobility are to be considered part of the name and must no longer be bestowed (Art. 109 III) is the only one left in force.

The first official constitution of the Republic of Korea (commonly referred to as South Korea) was originally based on the Weimar Constitution.

Notes 
†  Protections provided by Articles 114, 115, 117, 118, 123, 124, and 153 could be suspended or restricted by the President through invocation of his authority granted under Article 48 of the Weimar Constitution.

References

External links 

 The Constitution of the German Federation of August 11, 1919 – Selected Articles (source)
 History of Modern Germany Lectures – five lectures on the Weimar Republic

Politics of the Weimar Republic
Law in Nazi Germany
Government of Nazi Germany
1919 in law
Historical constitutions of Germany
1919 in politics
1919 documents
August 1919 events